Robert "Shep" Pettibone (born 10 July 1959) is an American record producer, remixer, songwriter and club DJ, one of the most prolific of the 1980s.

Career
Shep Pettibone surfaced after his work with Arthur Baker on Afrika Bambaataa & the Jazzy 5's "Jazzy Sensation" and as an in-house mix engineer for Prelude Records.
During his recording career, he launched innovative "mastermixes" for New York's KISS FM. The popularity of these mixes persuaded Prelude Records to release some of them commercially.
 
Pettibone built his brand through his personal approach to remixing tracks, specially crafted for the dancefloor. Acclaimed by DJs worldwide, he was the go-to man to achieve club and chart success. His prowess at production and mixing led him to work with such artists as Madonna and George Michael in the late 1980s during the height of these artists' popularity. His influence is still perceivable in today's music.

Pettibone is the subject of the first volume of the Arthur Baker Presents Dance Masters series, Shep Pettibone: The Classic 12" Master-Mixes, a 47-song box set with highlights from his career.

The "Vogue" case
Pettibone, co-writer and co-producer of Madonna's 1990 hit "Vogue", sued Warner Music in a dispute over withholding royalty payments.
An appeals court ruled that the music producer was not responsible for paying the publishing giant's legal fees in a previous case.

Discography

Selected remixing credits

Selected album production/writing credits

See also
Club Zanzibar
The Empress Hotel (New Jersey)
Paradise (nightclub)

References

External links
 Discography, media appearance & more (Discoradio 1979–1989)
 Large discography at ShepPettibone.com
'Vogue' Producer Shep Pettibone's First Interview in 20 Years

1959 births
Living people
20th-century American musicians
21st-century American musicians
American DJs
American dance musicians
Club DJs
People from Neptune Township, New Jersey
Post-disco musicians
Record producers from New Jersey
Songwriters from New Jersey
Remixers
20th-century American male musicians
21st-century American male musicians
American male songwriters
Electronic dance music DJs